Los Angeles Harbor College (LAHC) is a public community college in Wilmington, California. It is one of two community colleges serving the South Bay region of Los Angeles.  LAHC serves mainly students from Harbor City, Carson, San Pedro, Gardena, Lomita, Wilmington and the Palos Verdes Peninsula.

LAHC accommodates over 8,900 students per semester, and is located between Wilmington and Harbor City, the heart of the Los Angeles harbor region. As of 2010, 37% of LAHC's population were part-time students, with 65% describing themselves as full-time.  The school population is about 40% male and 60% female.

Academics 
Like most community colleges in the state of California, LAHC offers programs for students to eventually transfer to a four-year university as well as occupational training programs in business and office administration, electronics technology, computer technology, and nursing.  The college also offers a program for international students.

Notable alumni 

Gary Alexander, former catcher and outfielder in Major League Baseball
Bobby Brooks, major-league outfielder 
Enos Cabell, former third baseman and first baseman in Major League Baseball 
Benjamin Cayetano, former governor of Hawaii
Michael Dudikoff, American actor
Dock Ellis, former pitcher in Major League Baseball
David Hackworth, Army officer and author
Don Horn, NFL quarterback
Dennis Johnson, NBA player for the Boston Celtics, Seattle SuperSonics and Phoenix Suns
Chris Matthews, NFL and CFL wide receiver
Michael Mendoza, American football player
Juanita Millender-McDonald, former member of the US House of Representatives
Justin Miller, major-league pitcher
Haven Moses, NFL wide receiver
Scott Stantis, editorial cartoonist for the Chicago Tribune and creator of the comic strips The Buckets and Prickly City
Jon Weber, minor-league outfielder
Mike Watt, bassist for the Minutemen

See also
California Community Colleges System

References

External links 
 
 

 
California Community Colleges
Universities and colleges in Los Angeles
Wilmington, Los Angeles
Schools accredited by the Western Association of Schools and Colleges
Educational institutions established in 1949
1949 establishments in California
Two-year colleges in the United States